Pilotfish may refer to:

 Pilotfish (company), a company of designer
 Pilot fish, a fish of the family Carangidae
 USS Pilotfish (SS-386), a submarine
 USS Northampton (CLC-1): Pilotfish, a command ship designed in part to escort aircraft carriers lacking radar